Pârûn (Persian: پارون), also called Prasûn and Prasungul, is a small town and administrative center of Nuristan Province and its Parun District in  Afghanistan.

The city of Parun has a population of 1,647. It has 1 district and a total land area of 350 hectares. The total number of dwellings in Parun is 183.

On 15 August 2021, Parun was seized by Taliban fighters, becoming the thirty-second provincial capital to be captured by the Taliban as part of the wider 2021 Taliban offensive.

Land use 
Parun is a village in northeastern Afghanistan with only 350 hectares and 183 dwellings. It is predominantly forest land (54%) followed by agriculture (33%). Built-up land only accounts for 7% of total land
use. But unlike many other cities, Parun does not have any barren land and only 4 hectares of vacant plots.

Geography 
Parun has 6 villages: Ishtewi, Pronz, Dewa, Kushteki, Tsutsum and Pashki. They are located over a distance of 20 km from north to south along the Parun River. Ishtewi, the upper village, lies at an altitude of 2,850 m above sea level, while Pashki, the lowest village, lies at 2,500 m above sea level .

Climate
Under the Köppen climate classification, Parun has a subarctic climate (Dsc).

Plans for a city 
According to news published in 2007, the governor of Nuristan Province was planning to establish a city of about 20,000 people in Parun. This would make it "the first city in Nuristan". The report indicated that some construction had begun.

Languages 
Wasi-wari is natively spoken in Parun, while Kamkata-vari, Pashto and Dari are also understood. The Gurjars of Parun also speak their native language, known as Gujari.

References 

Populated places in Nuristan Province
Provincial capitals in Afghanistan